Alexander Donald Taylor AM (born 24 January 1928) is a former Australian politician who was a Labor Party member of the Legislative Assembly of Western Australia from 1968 to 1984, representing the seat of Cockburn. He served as a minister in the government of John Tonkin, including as deputy premier from 1973 to 1974. Taylor later served as Administrator of Christmas Island (an Australian external territory) from 1986 to 1990.

Early life
Taylor was born in Kalgoorlie to Lily Irene (née Jennings) and Alexander Taylor. He was raised in Perth, attending Perth Modern School, and was a state-level basketball player in his youth. Taylor studied teaching at the University of Western Australia and Claremont Teachers College, and after graduating worked at Applecross Senior High School (1959–1960) and Perth Modern School (1961–1962). He later worked as a rural education officer with the Junior Farmers' Council.

Politics
A member of the Labor Party from 1956, Taylor was elected to parliament at the 1968 state election, replacing the retiring Henry Curran in Cockburn. After the 1971 election, which saw the election of a Labor government, he was made Minister for Housing and Minister for Labour in the new ministry. Following a ministerial reshuffle in October 1971, Taylor's titles were Minister for Labour, Minister for Prices Control, and Minister for Tourism. He was additionally made Minister for Immigration in February 1973.

In May 1973, Herb Graham stepped down as deputy leader of the Labor Party, with Taylor being elected as his replacement and consequently being appointed deputy premier. He served as deputy premier until Labor's defeat at the 1974 election, a term of less than a year (the shortest term of any deputy premier in Western Australia). After the election, Taylor was replaced as Labor's deputy leader by Colin Jamieson. He remained in the shadow ministry until 1980, serving under three leaders of the opposition (John Tonkin, Colin Jamieson, and Ron Davies).

Later life
Taylor retired from parliament in August 1984. He served on the Judiciary and Parliamentary Salaries Tribunal from 1984 to 1986, and then was briefly chairman of the Authority for the Intellectually Handicapped. From 1986 to 1990, Taylor served as Administrator of Christmas Island, an Australian external territory in the Indian Ocean. He was made a Member of the Order of Australia (AM) in the 1991 Australia Day Honours, for "public service and service to the Western Australia parliament".

References

|-

|-

1928 births
Living people
Australian Labor Party members of the Parliament of Western Australia
Australian schoolteachers
Deputy Premiers of Western Australia
Members of the Order of Australia
Members of the Western Australian Legislative Assembly
People from Kalgoorlie
University of Western Australia alumni
Christmas Island administrators
People educated at Perth Modern School
Politicians from Perth, Western Australia